Umer Bin Abdul Rashid (6 February 1976 – 1 April 2002) was an English first-class cricketer who played for Middlesex and Sussex County Cricket Clubs.

Rashid played as an allrounder who bowled slow left-arm orthodox and batted left-handed. He was a member of the Marcus Trescothick led 1995 Under-19 series against South Africa. In one of the games he struck 64 from number 11 and made 97 not out in another. With the ball he took 10 for 71 in one of the unofficial Test matches played.

His first-class debut came in 1996 for Middlesex before he moved to Sussex in 1999. He made 2 centuries in his career, an innings of 110 against Glamorgan and 106 at Chester-le-Street. His slow left arm bowling gave him 49 first-class wickets and a best of 5 for 103 against Northampton.

In 2002 Sussex travelled to Grenada for a pre-season tournament. He had been swimming at a popular tourist spot Concord Falls when his brother Burhan got into trouble. Rashid drowned attempting to rescue him.

References

External links
 

1976 births
2002 deaths
Cricketers from Southampton
English cricketers
Sussex cricketers
Middlesex cricketers
Deaths by drowning
Accidental deaths in Grenada
British Universities cricketers
British Asian cricketers